"Point of No Return" is a single by the American pop group Exposé. Written and produced by Lewis Martineé, the single was originally released in 1984 on the Pantera label with Alejandra Lorenzo (Alé) as the lead singer. The single was re-recorded in 1987 with Jeanette Jurado as the lead vocalist and included on the group's debut album, Exposure (1987), when it was finally released on compact disc in 1989.

Background

"It's just a little song about loving somebody to the point of no return," said songwriter Lewis Martineé when asked if there was a deeper meaning to the song. "I just liked the title 'Point Of No Return,' so I decided to write a song around that. Then I started coming up with the beats and the synthesizer lines and then both melody and words. I wrote that song so fast it was crazy, like, literally 15 minutes. But then I didn't like the bridge and I changed it. I'm glad I did because the bridge actually came out really good at the end."

Reception
The original vocal mix of the song, featuring Lorenzo, reached the top of the Billboard Hot Dance Club Play chart in spring 1985. The re-recorded vocal version with Jurado reached #5 on the Billboard Hot 100 chart in July 1987.

Music video
The music video for "Point of No Return" features Exposé performing in front of an energetic audience. As of December 2022, it has been well-received on YouTube, with the release featuring over fourteen million views.

Track listings
 United States 12" single – 1984 edition

 United States 12" single – 1985 edition

 United States 7" single – 1987 edition

 United States 12" single – 1987 edition

Charts

Weekly charts

Year-end charts

Covers

 In 1997, the group MerenBooty Girls released its version on the album X-Tra Hot.

See also

 List of number-one dance singles of 1985 (U.S.)

References

1985 songs
1985 debut singles
1989 singles
Arista Records singles
Exposé (group) songs
Songs written by Lewis Martineé